Bel Durel Avounou (born 25 September 1997) is a Congolese professional footballer who plays as midfielder for Süper Lig club Ümraniyespor.

Club career
Born in Brazzaville, Avounou began his career with CESD La Djiri before signing a five-year contract with French team Caen in 2015. He made his senior debut on 5 August 2017 in the Ligue 1 first-round game at Montpellier. He spent the 2018–19 season on loan with Ligue 2 side Orléans.

At the end of his Caen contract, Avounou joined Le Mans, signing a one-year contract with the option of an additional year in June 2020.

On 10 June 2022, Avounou signed a one-year contract, with an option for a second year, with Ümraniyespor in Turkey.

International career
He made his international debut for the Republic of Congo in 2015.

References

External links

1997 births
Living people
Sportspeople from Brazzaville
Association football midfielders
Republic of the Congo footballers
Republic of the Congo international footballers
Stade Malherbe Caen players
US Orléans players
Le Mans FC players
Ümraniyespor footballers
Ligue 1 players
Championnat National players
Championnat National 3 players
Republic of the Congo expatriate footballers
Republic of the Congo expatriate sportspeople in France
Expatriate footballers in France
Republic of the Congo expatriate sportspeople in Turkey
Expatriate footballers in Turkey